Syed Mohammad Taqweem Ahsan (Urdu: سید محمد تقویم احسن), nom de plum S M Taqweem (Urdu: ایس ایم تقویم), is a journalist, social worker, and newsreader from Pakistan.
He is the founder president of the Pakistani welfare organisation "Burncare".

Early life and education 

S. M. Taqweem was born in Lahore. He received his primary education at Abbotabad and afterwards studied at Lahore until he matriculated, and then again proceeded to Abbotabad, where he studied for his degree (FSc). After graduating from Lahore, he was admitted to the University of the Punjab for an MA in journalism.

Journalistic career

S. M. Taqweem is a senior journalist, with a quarter of a century's experience. He has worked for almost all of Pakistan's major newspapers. His career started in 1979 as a cartoonist for the "Saadat".  In 1980 he joined the "Nawai-i-Waqt" in Lahore as a trainee, and then the "Pakistan Times" in 1982.  He joined the "Jang" newspaper in Lahore as a sub-editor, where he continued until 1990.  Taqweem joined the Daily Pakistan as a senior sub-editor, in which role he stayed till 1997, when he resigned in order to join the Lahore Din; he joined the Din as chief news editor/deputy editor; in 2002 he then joined the Awaz, where he is currently working as chief news editor.

In 1995 he applied to the London School of Journalism in the United Kingdom; his application was accepted, but he was unable to follow up on it due to the severe illness of his wife.

He has worked as a newsreader for Radio Pakistan, in Lahore.

References

External links  
Official website
Burncare website

Living people
Pakistani radio personalities
Pakistani writers
Journalists from Lahore
1959 births
University of the Punjab alumni